Ashwni Dhir (born 23 September 1968) is an Indian film director and scriptwriter. He has also written and  produced various TV serials for SAB TV

He has directed films like One Two Three (2008), Atithi Tum Kab Jaoge? (2010), Son Of Sardaar (2012) and Guest Iin London (2017) and he has produced chidiya ghar.

Filmography

Films

Television

References

Further reading

External links

 

Hindi-language film directors
1952 births
Living people
People from Kanpur
Indian television writers
Indian male screenwriters
Film directors from Uttar Pradesh
21st-century Indian film directors
Screenwriters from Uttar Pradesh
Male television writers